Nadine Keßler (born 4 April 1988) is a German retired footballer and current UEFA's head of women's football. She played for VfL Wolfsburg and the German national team. Keßler was the recipient of the FIFA World Player of the Year award at the 2014 FIFA Ballon d'Or.

Early life
Born in Landstuhl, Keßler was raised in nearby Weselberg, where she attended kindergarten and primary school. As a youth, she began playing for boys clubs SV Herschberg, SV Hermersberg, and SC Weselberg. At the age of 16, she began playing for the female team 1. FC Saarbrücken in the second division. From 2006 to 2007, she was the team's leading scorer.

After graduating from high school in 2007, Keßler began basic training in the Bundeswehr in October 2007. She was stationed in a sports promotion group at the Bundeswehr Sports School in Warendorf and held the rank of Corporal. She also attended the German University for Prevention and Health Management (DHfPG) where she received a Bachelor of Arts in Health Economics in 2012. In 2014, she enrolled in the MBA program at DHfPG.

Club career

1. FFC Turbine Potsdam
Keßler signed with 1. FFC Turbine Potsdam in the top-division Frauen Bundesliga in 2009 at the age of 21. She helped the team finish the regular season at the top of the league table with a  record scoring 11 goals. The team clinched the 2009–10 UEFA Women's Champions League after defeating Olympique Lyonnais in penalty kicks.

VfL Wolfsburg
In 2011, Keßler transferred to VfL Wolfsburg. The team finished second during the 2011–12 regular season with a  record. Keßler scored 11 goals tying for fourth in the league for most goals scored.

During the 2012–13 season, Keßler scored eight goals helping Wolfsburg finish first during the regular season with a  record. She captained the team to win the 2012–13 UEFA Champions League after defeating Olympique Lyonnais 1-0 in the final.

In 2014, Keßler led Wolfsburg to championships in the Frauen Bundesliga and UEFA Women's Champions League. Wolfsburg became the first German team in the history to win the treble of League, German Cup and Champions League.
 Keßler was awarded the UEFA Best Women's Player in Europe Award. She was awarded the FIFA Player of the Year award in January 2015 having received 17.52% of the vote over Marta (14.16%) and Abby Wambach (13.33%). Upon receiving the award, she said, "It's a reward for hard work, good performances and a good development track. I know it's a trophy for individuals, but I'd never have won it without my teammates."

She signed a new one-year contract on 12 May 2015. She announced her retirement on 14 April 2016.

International career
Keßler represented Germany at the youth level on the under-15, 17, 19, and 20 teams from 2003 to 2008. She made her debut for the senior national team at the 2010 Algarve Cup on 26 February 2010 in a match against Finland after coming on as a 46th-minute substitute for Lena Goeßling and scoring her first international goal in the 77th minute.

Keßler played attacking midfielder for Germany during the 2013 UEFA Women's Euro helping the team win their sixth consecutive trophy with a 1–0 win over Norway.

International goals
Scores and results list Germany's goal tally first, score column indicates score after each Keßler goal.

Honours
1. FC Saarbrücken
2. Bundesliga: 2006–07, 2008–09
German Cup: runner-up 2007–08

1. FFC Turbine Potsdam
Bundesliga: 2009–10, 2010–11
UEFA Women's Champions League: 2009–10
DFB-Hallenpokal: 2010

VfL Wolfsburg
 Bundesliga: 2012–13,  2013–14
 UEFA Women's Champions League: 2012–13, 2013–14
DFB-Pokal: 2012–13, 2014–15

Germany
FIFA U-17 Women's World Cup: Third place 2008
UEFA Women's U-19 Championship: 2006, 2007
UEFA Women's Championship: 2013
Algarve Cup: 2014
U-17-Nordic-Cup: 2005

Individual
Fritz Walter Medal: Silver 2006
UEFA Best Women's Player in Europe Award: 2014
FIFA World Player of the Year: 2014
IFFHS World's Women Best Playmaker: 2014
IFFHS UEFA Woman Team of the Decade 2011–2020

References

External links

1988 births
Living people
German women's footballers
1. FC Saarbrücken (women) players
1. FFC Turbine Potsdam players
VfL Wolfsburg (women) players
Women's association football midfielders
Germany women's international footballers
FIFA World Player of the Year winners
UEFA Women's Championship-winning players
People from Landstuhl
Footballers from Rhineland-Palatinate